Antonio Comaschi (born 29 January 1951) is an Argentine boxer. He competed in the men's lightweight event at the 1972 Summer Olympics.

References

1951 births
Living people
Argentine male boxers
Olympic boxers of Argentina
Boxers at the 1972 Summer Olympics
Place of birth missing (living people)
Lightweight boxers